This is a list of movable bridges in Connecticut within the State of Connecticut's borders. Eight of the movable bridges are on the Amtrak route through Connecticut. These bridges are the Mianus River Railroad Bridge, the Norwalk River Railroad Bridge, the Saugatuck River Railroad Bridge, the Pequonnock River Railroad Bridge, the Housatonic River Railroad Bridge, the Connecticut River Railroad Bridge, the Old Saybrook-Old Lyme, the Niantic River Bridge, the East Lyme-Waterford, Thames River Bridge.

Bridges

NRHP - National Register of Historic Places listed
HAER - Historic American Engineering Record listed

See also
List of bridges documented by the Historic American Engineering Record in Connecticut
List of bridges on the National Register of Historic Places in Connecticut

Notes

References

Bridges in Connecticut
Connecticut
Connecticut
Bridges, movable